Cuphophyllus is a genus of agaric fungi in the family Hygrophoraceae. Cuphophyllus species belong to a group known as waxcaps in English, sometimes also waxy caps in North America or waxgills in New Zealand. In Europe, Cuphophyllus species are typical of waxcap grasslands, a declining habitat due to changing agricultural practices. As a result, four species, Cuphophyllus atlanticus (as C. canescens), C. colemannianus, C. lacmus, and C. lepidopus are of global conservation concern and are listed as "vulnerable" on the IUCN Red List of Threatened Species.

Taxonomy

History
The genus was described by French mycologist Marcel Bon in 1985, though it was subsequently synonymized with Hygrocybe by some authorities. Cuphophyllus species have sometimes been referred to the genus Camarophyllus (Fr.) P.Kumm., but, as argued by Donk (1962), the type species of Camarophyllus must be Agaricus camarophyllus Alb. & Schwein. the species from which the genus takes its name. This means that Camarophyllus sensu stricto is a synonym of Hygrophorus, since A. camarophyllus is a Hygrophorus species (Hygrophorus camarophyllus). This is now accepted by all standard authorities. Singer (1951), however, proposed Agaricus pratensis (= Cuphophyllus pratensis) as the type species of Camarophyllus, which means that Camarophyllus sensu Singer is a synonym of Cuphophyllus.

Current status
Recent molecular research, based on cladistic analysis of DNA sequences, indicates that Cuphophyllus is monophyletic and forms a natural group distinct from Hygrocybe sensu stricto.

Description
Species are distinguished from most other waxcaps by producing non-viscid, typically white, grey, or brownish basidiocarps (fruit bodies) often with decurrent lamellae (gills). Species of the genus Chromosera are superficially similar, though often more brightly coloured.

Habitat and Distribution
In Europe, Cuphophyllus species are typically found in agriculturally unimproved, short-sward grasslands (including pastures and lawns). Elsewhere, they are most frequently found in woodland. The genus is cosmopolitan.

Economic usage
Fruit bodies of one of the commoner European waxcap species, C. pratensis, are edible and widely collected, sometimes being offered for sale in local markets.

Species
C. acutoides
C. adonis
C. albidocinereus
C. angustifolius
C. antillanus
C. atlanticus 
C. aurantius
C. basidiosus
C. berkeleyi
C. bicolor
C. bondii
C. borealis
C. canescens
C. cereopallidus
C. cinerellus
C. cinereus
C. citrinopallidus
C. colemannianus
C. comosus
C. esteriae 
C. flavipes
C. flavipesoides
C. fornicatus
C. fuscensis
C. griseorufescens
C. hygrocyboides
C. lacmus
C. lamarum
C. lepidopus
C. nebularis
C. neopratensis
C. neopratensis
C. ochraceopallidus
C. pegleri
C. pratensis
C. pseudopallidus
C. radiatus
C. rainierensis
C. recurvatus
C. rigelliae
C. roseascens 
C. russocoriaceus
C. subradiatus
C. subviolaceus
C. umbrinus
C. virgineus

See also
List of Agaricales genera

References

Agaricales genera
Hygrophoraceae